Jaime Matossian (born 26 September 1955 in Madrid, Spain) is a retired Spanish equestrian. His horse was named New Venture.

Matossian competed at the 2000 Summer Olympics.

References

1955 births
Living people
Sportspeople from Madrid
Spanish dressage riders
Equestrians at the 2000 Summer Olympics
Olympic equestrians of Spain
Spanish male equestrians